The 1989–90 NBA season was the 44th season for the Boston Celtics in the National Basketball Association. With Larry Bird returning after only playing just six games in the 1988–89 season due to heel injuries, and with last year's first round draft pick Brian Shaw leaving the team to play overseas in Italy, the Celtics struggled around .500 during the first month of the season, but would win 11 of their next 15 games, holding a 28–18 record at the All-Star break, finishing second in the Atlantic Division with a solid 52–30 record. The Celtics also qualified for the playoffs for the eleventh consecutive season.

Bird led the way averaging 24.3 points, 9.5 rebounds and 7.5 assists per game, while being named to the All-NBA Second Team, while sixth man Kevin McHale averaged 20.9 points, 8.3 rebounds and 1.9 blocks per game, while being named to the NBA All-Defensive Second Team, and Robert Parish provided the team with 15.7 points and 10.1 rebounds per game. Bird, McHale and Parish were all selected for the 1990 NBA All-Star Game. In addition, Reggie Lewis contributed 17.0 points per game, and Dennis Johnson provided with 7.1 points and 6.5 assists per game.

In the Eastern Conference First Round of the playoffs, the Celtics looked ready to make a serious run as they jumped out to a 2–0 series lead over the 5th-seeded New York Knicks, with a 157–128 home win in Game 2, which was a playoff record of the most points scored in a game. However, they would collapse as they lost three straight games, losing 3–2 to the Knicks. 

Following the season, Johnson retired, and head coach Jimmy Rodgers was fired after coaching the Celtics for two seasons.

Draft picks

Roster

Regular season
Larry Bird, the Celtics star player, was coming back after surgery to both heels the previous season and later said he never felt the same. Despite the injury, the Celtics were able to rise to 2nd place in the Atlantic Division. By the end of the regular season, the Celtics had scored an average of 110 points per a game, and allowed an average of 106 points per game. During the playoffs against the Knicks that year, the Celtics quickly took the first 2 games of the series, but the New York Knicks would come back and rally to win 3 games in a row, sending the Celtics home.

Season standings

Record vs. opponents

Game log

Playoffs

|- align="center" bgcolor="#ccffcc"
| 1
| April 26
| New York
| W 116–105
| Larry Bird (24)
| Larry Bird (18)
| Larry Bird (10)
| Boston Garden14,890
| 1–0
|- align="center" bgcolor="#ccffcc"
| 2
| April 28
| New York
| W 157–128
| Kevin McHale (31)
| Robert Parish (16)
| Larry Bird (16)
| Boston Garden14,890
| 2–0
|- align="center" bgcolor="#ffcccc"
| 3
| May 2
| @ New York
| L 99–102
| Larry Bird (31)
| Robert Parish (10)
| Larry Bird (8)
| Madison Square Garden18,212
| 2–1
|- align="center" bgcolor="#ffcccc"
| 4
| May 4
| @ New York
| L 108–135
| Kevin McHale (24)
| Larry Bird (8)
| Johnson, Bagley (6)
| Madison Square Garden18,212
| 2–2
|- align="center" bgcolor="#ffcccc"
| 5
| May 6
| New York
| L 114–121
| Larry Bird (31)
| Bird, Parish (9)
| Dennis Johnson (10)
| Boston Garden14,890
| 2–3
|-

Player statistics

Season

Larry Bird 24.5 ppg

Awards and records
 Larry Bird, All-NBA Second Team
 Kevin McHale, NBA All-Defensive Second Team

Transactions

See also
 1989–90 NBA season

References

Boston Celtics seasons
Boston Celtics
Boston Celtics
Boston Celtics
Celtics
Celtics